Glycyphana is a genus of beetles of the family Scarabaeidae.

Glycyphana Burmeister, 1842
 Glycyphana stolata, (brown flower beetle)
 Glycyphana brunnipes
 Glycyphana (Glycyphaniola) allardi Antoine
 Glycyphana (Glycyphaniola) chamnongi Antoine
 Glycyphana (Glycyphaniola) malayensis ornata Antoine

See also
 Vincent Allard, eponymous for Glycyphana (Glycyphaniola) allardi Antoine, 1992

References

Cetoniinae